Jay R. Berkovitz is Professor of Judaic and Near Eastern Studies and director of the Center for Jewish Studies at the University of Massachusetts Amherst.

Jay Berkovitz completed his Ph.D. from Brandeis University in 1983. He taught at Spertus College in Chicago, Bar Ilan University, Hebrew College, Hebrew University of Jerusalem, Touro College, Trinity College, and the University of Connecticut Storrs. At Amherst he is an adjunct member of both the History Department and the Department of French and Italian Studies.

Berkovitz has published widely on Jewish social and intellectual history of modern Europe, with an emphasis on communal governance, family, law and ritual, and rabbinic scholarship. One of his recent projects, supported by a Faculty Research Grant, focuses on the adjudication of civil disputes in early modern rabbinic courts.

Published works

Author

References 

Brandeis University alumni
Historians of France
Historians of Jews and Judaism
Historians of the Middle East
Jewish American historians
American male non-fiction writers
Living people
Writers from Newton, Massachusetts
Scholars of antisemitism
University of Massachusetts Amherst faculty
Year of birth missing (living people)
21st-century American historians
21st-century American male writers
Historians from Massachusetts